1,1,1-Tris(diphenylphosphinomethyl)ethane, also called Triphos, is an organophosphorus compound with the formula CH3C[CH2PPh2]3.  An air-sensitive white solid, it is a tripodal ligand ("three-legged") of idealized C3v symmetry. It was originally prepared by the reaction of sodium diphenylphosphide and CH3C(CH2Cl)3:
3 Ph2PNa  +  CH3C(CH2Cl)3   →   CH3C[CH2PPh2]3  +  3 NaCl

It forms complexes with many transition metals, usually as a tripodal ligand. Such complexes are used to analyze mechanistic aspects of homogeneous catalysts. For example, rhodium forms complexes with  CH3C[CH2PPh2]3 like [(triphos)RhCl(C2H4)], [(triphos)RhH(C2H4)], and [(triphos)Rh(C2H5)(C2H4)], provide model intermediates in the catalytic cycle for hydrogenation of alkenes.

Triphos sometimes behaves as a bidentate ligand. Illustrative cases include fac-[Mn(CO)3Br(η2-triphos)] and [M(CO)4(η2-triphos)], where M is Cr, Mo, or W. Triphos serves as a tridentate-bridging ligand in an icosahedral Au13 cluster. The phosphine bridges three chlorogold(I) groups to form the tripod molecule of trichloro-1,1,1-(diphenylphosphinomethyl)ethanetrigold(I), CH3C[CH2PPh2AuCl]3.

Related ligands
Tris(aminomethyl)ethane, a tripodal triamine (CH3C(CH2NH2)3)
Bis(diphenylphosphinoethyl)phenylphosphine (PhP(C2H4PPh2)2)

References

Tertiary phosphines
Phenyl compounds
Chelating agents
Tridentate ligands